WebPositive (also called Web+) is a web browser included with the Haiku operating system. It was created to replace the aging BeZillaBrowser with a WebKit-based browser.

Origin
One part of its name is a tip of the hat to BeOS' simple NetPositive, while the other points to its modern foundation: WebKit, the open source browser engine at the heart of many other mainstream browsers, like Apple's Safari. By making use of WebKit as its engine, WebPositive is able to keep up with the latest web technologies.

History
In the Google Summer of Code 2009, Maxime Simon, mentored by Ryan Leavengood, was commissioned to work on a WebKit port for Haiku, initiated by the work Leavengood had done for a bounty on the Haikuware website. This led to the development of the HaikuLauncher prototype browser, which demonstrated the functionality of the WebKit rendering engine but did little else.

In February 2010, Stephan Aßmus took on the task of improving the HaikuLauncher web browser to make it more usable. This led to many preview releases before a relatively stable version (r488) was integrated into Haiku R1 / Alpha 2. In that same year, Ryan Leavengood took over as the lead developer of WebPositive.

Earlier versions of WebPositive used cURL services but they were slow and had many other bugs, one of the more serious being that cookies overloaded at times. It became clear that cURL could not be used in WebPositive. In October 2013, Adrien Destugues, also known as PulkoMandy, was contracted to work on WebPositive full-time, which culminated in his assuming project leadership for WebPositive and HaikuWebKit. Destugues replaced cURL as the core of the application with Haiku's Service Kit, a product earlier developed by Stephan Aßmus and Christophe Huriaux during 2010's Google Summer of Code, and Alexandre Deckner in 2011. Destugues has also made significant improvements to WebPositive's HTML5 support in WebKit, such as implementing support for datalists and color input.

References

External links 
 WebPositive User Guide
 WebPositive tag on Haiku-OS.org
 Destugues' talk on HaikuWebKit and Web+ at BeGeistert 028

Free software programmed in C++
Gopher clients
Haiku
Software based on WebKit
2010 software